Caryocolum kroesmanniella is a moth of the family Gelechiidae. It is found from Fennoscandia to the Pyrenees, Alps and Romania and from Great Britain to southern Russia (the Ural Mountains). The habitat consists of open woodland.

The length of the forewings is 5.5–6.5 mm for males and 6–7 mm for females. The forewings are whitish, mottled with light brown and orange-brown. Adults have been recorded on wing from early July to early September.

The larvae feed on Stellaria holostea and Stellaria uliginosa. Young larvae mine the leaves of their host plant. The mine has the form of a long and broad gallery with a central frass line. Older larvae live free among spun leaves. Mining larvae can be found from autumn to May.

References

Moths described in 1854
kroesmanniella
Moths of Europe